Buescher Band Instrument Company Building, also known as the Buescher Building, was a historic factory building located at Elkhart, Elkhart County, Indiana.  The original section was built in 1904, with additions made in 1909, 1914, 1920, 1922, 1923, and 1946.  It was a two-story, "U-shaped, painted brick building.  It has been demolished.

It was added to the National Register of Historic Places in 1986 and delisted in 1996.

References

Former National Register of Historic Places in Indiana
Industrial buildings and structures on the National Register of Historic Places in Indiana
Industrial buildings completed in 1904
Buildings and structures in Elkhart, Indiana
National Register of Historic Places in Elkhart County, Indiana